"Salade de fruits" (Translation: Fruit salad) is a 1959 song by Bourvil.

Background and writing 
The song was written by Noël Roux and Armand Canfora.

Commercial performance 
In France the song was released on an EP by Bourvil in 1959.

Soon it was covered by Belgian actress and singer Annie Cordy. (She also released her version on an EP.)

In Wallonia (French Belgium) the song reached no. 3.

Track listings

Bourvil version 
7-inch EP Pathé EG 488 M
 A1. "Salade de fruits" (3:15)
 A2. "Les rois fainéants" (3:06)
 B. "On a vécu pour ça" (4:16)

Annie Cordy version 
7-inch EP Columbia ESRF 1235 M
 A1. "Ivanhoe"
 A2. "Qu'il fait bon vivre"
 B1. "Salade de fruits"
 B2. "Personalités"

Cover versions 
The tune has also been recorded by Luis Mariano (in 1960), Franck Pourcel, Mad Dodo (in 1992), and Roberto Alagna (in 2005).

Charts

Luis Mariano version

References

External links 
 Bourvil — Salade de fruits (EP) at Discogs
 Annie Cordy — Salade de fruits (EP) at Discogs

1959 songs
1959 singles
Bourvil songs
Pathé-Marconi singles